Roger Q. Mills (1832–1911) was a U.S. Senator from 1892 to 1899. Senator Mills may also refer to:

Edgar G. Mills (1860–?), Wisconsin State Senate
Elijah H. Mills (1776–1829), Massachusetts
Fred Mills (politician) (born 1955), Louisiana State Senate
George D. Mills (1898–1948), Illinois State Senate
John Mills (Massachusetts politician) (1787–1861), Massachusetts State Senate
Morris Mills (born 1929), Indiana State Senate
Ogden L. Mills (1884–1937), New York State Senate
Peter Mills (American politician) (born 1943), Maine
Robby Mills (born 1967), Kentucky State Senate
Roger H. Mills (1813–1881), Connecticut State Senate
Simeon Mills (1810–1895), Wisconsin State Senate
Thomas Brooks Mills (1857–1930), Wisconsin State Senate
William J. Mills (1849–1915), Connecticut State Senate